Indra Angad-Gaur (born 4 March 1974 in The Hague) is a retired female foil fencer from the Netherlands.

During her career she won three bronze medals in Fencing World Cup events: at Shanghai and Cairo in the 2004–05 season, and at Leipzig in the 2007–08 season. She also qualified for the 2008 Summer Olympics in which she won against Eman El Gammal in the first round before being eliminated by Margherita Granbassi in the second round.

She retired from international competition in 2010. She is now an international referee in the three weapons.

References

External links
 Profile at the European Fencing Championships

1974 births
Living people
Dutch female foil fencers
Fencers at the 2008 Summer Olympics
Olympic fencers of the Netherlands
Sportspeople from The Hague